Albert Boutinet (7 June 1901 – 20 December 1963) was a French racing cyclist. He rode in the 1924 Tour de France.

References

1901 births
1963 deaths
French male cyclists
Place of birth missing